Zetto is an unincorporated community in Clay County, Georgia, United States.

Notes

Unincorporated communities in Clay County, Georgia
Unincorporated communities in Georgia (U.S. state)